Walter Ohmsen (7 June 1911 – 19 February 1988) was a highly decorated Oberleutnant zur See in the Kriegsmarine during World War II. On 6 June 1944 the Western Allies launched Operation Overlord, the amphibious invasion of Normandy, France. Ohmsen was the first German defender of Fortress Europe to sight the invasion force. His battery engaged in heavy fighting and subsequently Ohmsen was awarded the Knight's Cross of the Iron Cross (Ritterkreuz des Eisernen Kreuzes) for the defense of the Crisbecq Battery against the American 4th Infantry Division, which landed on Utah Beach. The Knight's Cross of the Iron Cross recognised extreme battlefield bravery or successful military leadership.

Military service
Walter Ohmsen was born on 7 June 1911, in Elmshorn and joined the military service of the Reichsmarine of the Weimar Republic on 1 April 1929 in Stralsund. He became a Matrosengefreiter (Seaman First Class) on 1 April 1933, and Bootsmannmaat (Petty Officer Third Class -Coxswain) on 1 September 1934. From 12 December 1934, until 1 January 1944, he was platoon commander, company commander then head of telemetry training at the Naval Artillery School in Sassnitz. He had been promoted to Oberbootsmannsmaat (Boatswain's Mate 2nd class) on 1 November 1935 and Bootsmann (Boatswain's Mate 1st class) on 1 September 1936. He served at sea on the German battleship Schleswig-Holstein, the training vessel Gorch Fock, the training ship Carl-Zeiss, the torpedo boat T-153 and the cruiser Königsberg. He attained the rank of Stabsoberbootsmann (Chief Boatswain's Mate) on 1 July 1940, and was awarded the War Merit Cross 2nd class with swords on 20 April 1941. During his assignment at the Coastal Artillery School he was promoted to Kriegsoffiziersanwärter (Officer Candidate) and became an officer attaining the rank of Leutnant der Marineartillerie (Ensign of Coastal Artillery) on 1 January 1942, and Oberleutnant (M.A.) (Lieutenant Junior Grade).

Normandy invasion
Ohmsen had taken command of the Crisbecq Battery , also known as Marine Küsten Batterie "Marcouf" (Naval Coastal Battery Marcouf) or Seeziel Batterie "Marcouf" (Sea Target Battery Marcouf), on 1 February 1944. His command, including himself, consisted of three officers, 24 non-commissioned officers and 287 men of the Kriegsmarine. The unit was subordinated to the Marine-Artillerie-Abteilung 260 (M.A.A. 260—260th Naval Coastal Artillery Battalion). The battery's personnel was further augmented by members of the 6./Grenadier-Regiment 919 (6th Company, 919th Grenadier Regiment) of the 709. Infanterie-Division (709th Infantry Division) for ground defense under the command of Leutnant Geissler, which brought the overall manpower of the battery close to 400 men.

On 6 June 1944, at 5 a.m. Ohmsen was the first to sight the Allied invasion fleet through the battery rangefinder. He immediately reported his observation to the Kriegsmarine headquarters at Cherbourg, which triggered the German alarm throughout installations on the Atlantic coast. The notification of the award of his Knight's Cross of the Iron Cross (Ritterkreuz des Eisernen Kreuzes), announced in the German newspapers on 15 June 1944, also referred to Ohmsen as the first person to report the invasion fleet off Normandy. At 5:55 a.m., Ohmsen's battery targeted and exchanged fire with the US cruisers USS Tuscaloosa and USS Quincy and the US battleship USS Nevada. At 6:30 a.m., the battery fired upon the US destroyer USS Corry and sank her.

At 8 a.m., Nevada hit the foremost casemated gun. The US battleships USS Texas and USS Arkansas, originally assigned to provide covering fire for the landing at Omaha Beach, intervened to help silence the Crisbecq Battery. At 9 a.m. the concentrated fire of the three battleships put the second casemate out of action, when a shell from Nevada pierced the embrasure, killing the entire crew. It caused heavy losses among the Americans and hindered the landing of material and reinforcements at Utah Beach.

The American 1st Battalion, 22nd Infantry Regiment, 4th Infantry Division started their advance towards Saint-Marcouf and the Crisbecq Battery at 7 a.m. on 7 June. After the first assault they succeeded in entering Saint-Marcouf but were stopped in front of the battery by the 75 mm Flak guns that had been repaired and were put in firing positions against ground targets. A German counterattack on the flanks of the American forces, supported by the 105 mm K331 (f) guns from the Azeville battery  forced Captain Tom Shields to withdraw. Concurrent to this ground fighting, the artillery duel between the Crisbecq Battery and the Allied fleet continued. One of the Škoda 210 mm gun K39/41 had been put back into service during the previous night. The gun was damaged once more and remained silent for the rest of the day. The Americans brought several field artillery guns in position during the afternoon and immediately started firing at the battery. Subsequently, the battery was subjected to harassing fire every night.

Ohmsen was awarded the Iron Cross 2nd Class (Eisernes Kreuz 2. Klasse) in the morning of 7 June 1944 for his defense of his strong point against the American attacks. On the evening of 7 June he received a phone call from Cherbourg with the information that he had been awarded the Iron Cross 1st Class (Eisernes Kreuz 1. Klasse) in addition to the earlier award. Ohmsen was wounded on the left hand during a bombardment of the battery in the afternoon of 8 June.

The American 1st Battalion started their second attack on the battery at 10 a.m. on 8 June and retook the village of Saint-Marcouf. At 1:30 p.m. after the naval artillery had prepared the attack with a 20-minute bombardment and rolling artillery fire the attack on the battery continued. The Americans succeeded in entering the battery perimeter. The Germans had fallen back in the shelters but the last 210 mm gun was destroyed. At 4 p.m., American forces started to blow up the shelters; seeing that his forces had been overwhelmed, Ohmsen ordered the Azeville Battery to fire on his own position with its four 105 mm guns to chase them away. The effect was immediate and the Americans fell back in disarray. American casualties reached 15% of the forces they had committed to the attack and 98 soldiers were taken prisoner.

By the morning of 11 June, Ohmsen had run out of ammunition and medical equipment for the wounded and all his guns were out of service. In the afternoon, he received a phone call from Konteradmiral (Counter Admiral or Rear Admiral) Walter Hennecke, who instructed him to escape with the survivors. On 14 June, Ohmsen and his men reached the Morsalines battery, where he was decorated with the Knight's Cross of the Iron Cross. Ohmsen and his men were subsequently assigned to an infantry company and took part in the final days of the Battle of Cherbourg. Ohmsen was taken prisoner of war in Cherbourg on 26 June by the American forces. He was released on 15 March 1946.

On 12 June, the soldiers of the 9th Infantry Division, who had come ashore the previous day, readied themselves for an attack on the battery. At 8:30 a.m., the men of the 2nd Battalion of the 39th Infantry Regiment started their attack but found only an empty battery. The fighting over the battery took a heavy toll on both sides, 307 German soldiers died to defend it and about as many Americans died to take it.

Later life
After World War II, Ohmsen initially worked as a government employee of the Schleswig-Holstein agricultural ministry. He ran for public office as a candidate of the Schleswig-Holstein-Block in the 1954 Landtag of Schleswig-Holstein election. During an election speech, he disparaged the Minister-President of Schleswig-Holstein . Ohmsen was immediately dismissed without notice from his position in the agricultural ministry for insulting the Minister-President. He rejoined the military service of the Bundeswehr on 16 March 1956, as a Kapitänleutnant (Captain Lieutenant) of the Bundesmarine (German Federal Navy). He was promoted to Korvettenkapitän (Corvette Captain) on 15 November 1957, and Fregattenkapitän (Frigate Captain) on 13 August 1965 and retired on 30 September 1967.

From 1968 to 1978, Ohmsen was one of the organizers of the sailing at the Summer Olympics events and of numerous other larger sailing regattas and events. From 1970 to 1978, he also served as a member of the consultative council of the city of Kiel and was involved in the support of war victims. For these services he received the Freiherr-von-Stein commemorative medal and Federal Cross of Merit 2nd Class (Bundesverdienstkreuz 2. Klasse). The father of three daughters, Walter Ohmsen died in Kiel on 19 February 1988.

Awards and decorations
 Iron Cross (1939)
 2nd Class (7 June 1944)
 1st Class (7 June 1944)
 War Merit Cross 2nd Class with Swords (20 April 1941)
 Knight's Cross of the Iron Cross on 14 June 1944 as Oberleutnant (M.A.) and chief of the Marinebatterie "Marcouf" (Marine-Artillerie-Abteilung 260)
 Freiherr-von-Stein commemorative medal
 Federal Cross of Merit 2nd Class

Promotions

Notes

References

Citations

Bibliography

 
 
 Penrose, Jane (2004). The D-Day companion: leading historians explore history's greatest amphibious assault. Osprey Publishing. .

External links
Der Spiegel 36/1954 
Deutsche Marinearchiv
BBC h2g2 - the Defenders' Story
Sinking of the USS Corry (DD-463)
 
 

1911 births
1988 deaths
People from Elmshorn
People from the Province of Schleswig-Holstein
Kriegsmarine personnel
German Navy personnel
Recipients of the Knight's Cross of the Iron Cross
Recipients of the Cross of the Order of Merit of the Federal Republic of Germany
German prisoners of war in World War II held by the United States
German Party (1947) politicians
Christian Democratic Union of Germany politicians
Reichsmarine personnel
Military personnel from Schleswig-Holstein